Secretum may refer to:

Secretum (book), a book by Petrarch
, a book by Monaldi & Sorti
Secretum (room) at the British Museum
A sigillum secretum, a special seal used for private correspondence